Liassine Cadamuro-Bentaïba (born 5 March 1988) is a professional footballer who plays for Régional 1 club Istres. A versatile defender, he can operate as a right back, central defender or left back.

After starting out at Real Sociedad (first and second teams), he went on to represent clubs (other than in Spain) in Switzerland, France, Romania and Greece. 

Born in France, Cadamuro featured in the Algeria national team's squads at the 2014 World Cup, and three Africa Cup of Nations tournaments.

Club career

Real Sociedad
At the age of 15, Cadamuro joined Sochaux's youth system, going on to represent the reserves in three seasons. In summer 2008, he moved to Spain and signed for Real Sociedad.

With the Basques, Cadamuro played another three years with the B side, two in the third division and one in the fourth. He was promoted to the first team for the 2011–12 campaign, following the arrival of countryman Philippe Montanier as team manager. On 10 September 2011, he made his La Liga debut, coming on as a substitute for Xabi Prieto in the 70th minute of a 2–2 home draw against Barcelona.

Cadamuro finished his first season with Real with 19 league appearances (13 starts), helping to a final 12th position. He agreed to a two-year extension on 2 January 2013, extending his contract until 2016.

On 8 January 2014, after having been sparingly played during the first half of the campaign, Cadamuro joined Segunda División club Mallorca on loan until June. On 31 August, he signed with another second-tier side, Osasuna, also on loan.

Later career
In early February 2016, Camaduro signed with Servette of the Swiss Promotion League for six months with an option for two further seasons, subject to a medical examination. He made his debut on 5 March against SC Kriens after replacing the injured Tibert Pont late into the first half, but only lasted 19 minutes as he was sent off after receiving his second yellow card of the match.

Cadamuro returned to France in the 2017 off-season, joining Nîmes Olympique from Ligue 2. He scored his first professional goal in that country on 19 September, helping to a 4–0 away defeat of Tours FC.

On 16 August 2018, Cadamuro had a trial at Gimnàstic de Tarragona. He agreed to a two-year contract with the Catalans six days later, returning to Spain and its second division.

On 31 January 2019, Cadamuro moved to Concordia Chiajna in the Romanian Liga I. A year later, he was signed by Super League Greece's Volos.

Returning to France, Cadamuro played in the fifth-tier Championnat National 3 for Athlético Marseille and Istres.

International career

On 7 January 2012, Algeria national team coach Vahid Halilhodžić was in the stands to watch Cadamuro in a league match against Osasuna. The following day, in an interview with French website FootMercato.net, the player stated that his intentions had always been to represent Algeria in international competition, despite also having the option to play for France and Italy.

On 10 February 2012, Real Sociedad's website announced that Cadamuro was officially called up by Halilhodžić for the 2013 Africa Cup of Nations qualifier against Gambia. The Algerian Football Federation confirmed the information five days later, and he made his debut on the 29th starting in the 2–1 win.

Cadamuro was selected to the Algeria's list of 23 players for the 2014 FIFA World Cup, but did not play any games. On 26 June, even though on the bench, he managed to receive a yellow card for wasting time by kicking the ball away in the last group stage match against Russia, as the nation held on to the 1–1 draw and reached the last-16.

Cadamuro scored his only international goal on 11 January 2015, in a 1–1 friendly draw against neighbours Tunisia. He was also called up for the continental cup in that year and 2017, the former as an injury replacement for Essaïd Belkalem.

Personal life
Cadamuro was born in Toulouse, France, to an Italian father and an Algerian mother, originally from Tipaza Province. In June 2016, he married fellow footballer Louisa Nécib.

Career statistics

Club

International

Score and result list Algeria's goal tally first, score column indicates score after Cadamuro goal.

References

External links

1988 births
Living people
French sportspeople of Algerian descent
French sportspeople of Italian descent
Algerian people of Italian descent
Footballers from Toulouse
French footballers
Algerian footballers
Association football defenders
Ligue 2 players
Championnat National 3 players
FC Sochaux-Montbéliard players
Nîmes Olympique players
Athlético Marseille players
FC Istres players
La Liga players
Segunda División players
Segunda División B players
Tercera División players
Real Sociedad B footballers
Real Sociedad footballers
RCD Mallorca players
CA Osasuna players
Gimnàstic de Tarragona footballers
Swiss Challenge League players
Servette FC players
Liga I players
CS Concordia Chiajna players
Super League Greece players
Volos N.F.C. players
Algeria international footballers
2013 Africa Cup of Nations players
2014 FIFA World Cup players
2015 Africa Cup of Nations players
2017 Africa Cup of Nations players
French expatriate footballers
Algerian expatriate footballers
Expatriate footballers in Spain
Expatriate footballers in Switzerland
Expatriate footballers in Romania
Expatriate footballers in Greece
Algerian expatriate sportspeople in Spain
Algerian expatriate sportspeople in Switzerland
Algerian expatriate sportspeople in Romania
Algerian expatriate sportspeople in Greece
French expatriate sportspeople in Spain
French expatriate sportspeople in Switzerland
French expatriate sportspeople in Romania
French expatriate sportspeople in Greece